This is a table of the former European Parliament constituencies in the United Kingdom, listing the number of Members of the European Parliament each elected at each European Parliamentary election. The United Kingdom left the European Union on 31 January 2020. As a result, these constituencies no longer exist.

Great Britain was divided into single-member first-past-the-post constituencies from the 1979 election until the 1999 election, when it was divided into twelve multimember D'Hondt party list constituencies. Northern Ireland was a single constituency using Single Transferable Vote from 1979 to 2020.

With the exception of Gibraltar's inclusion in South West England, the constituencies otherwise corresponded with the NUTS 1 regions of the United Kingdom, though the naming differed slightly to distinguish them from other European constituencies.

Notes

References

See also
 European Parliament constituencies in the Republic of Ireland